Meteor was a marque of automobiles offered by Ford Motor Company of Canada from 1949 to 1976. The make was retired for the 1962 and 1963 model years, when the name was used for the Mercury Meteor sold in the United States. It succeeded the Mercury 114, a Canadian-market Mercury based on the Ford, the "114" name being taken from the car's wheelbase.

It complemented the Mercury, and gave Canadian Mercury-Lincoln dealers a car to sell in the low-price market, against the Canadian Pontiac. Similarly, Canadian Ford dealers offered the Monarch, a line of cars based on the Mercury models, to compete against the Oldsmobile. This was due to the dealer structure in Canada, where smaller communities might have only a single dealer that was expected to carry a full line of models in both the low- and mid-price classes. From 1949–1959, Meteor typically ran fourth in overall sales, behind Chevrolet, Ford, and Pontiac.

History 
The initial 1949 Meteor was introduced on June 25, 1948, at the same time the Ford Deluxe and Custom series were introduced across North America, and shared the new postwar full-sized Ford bodies, chassis, and powertrains but with unique trim. Meteor, as well as the Canadian Ford, kept the flathead V8 engine through 1954. The new OHV V8 which US Fords offered beginning in 1954 was not introduced in Canada until the 1955 model year. The following year, Ford of Canada introduced a six-cylinder engine for Canadian Ford and Meteor cars. Meteor models continued to use the Ford body with unique items such as grilles, taillights, and moldings. The 1952–1954 Meteors used Mercury instrument panels and dashboards. In mid-1954, some Niagara and Rideau models began using Ford instrument panels and dashes. These cars were named Niagara Special and Rideau Special and were priced around C$67 less than regular Niagaras or Rideaus.

In 1954, Meteor changed to its own series names. The entry-level car was called just Meteor, replacing Ford's Mainline series. The mid-level Ford Customline became the Meteor Niagara, while the top trim level Ford Crestline became the Meteor Rideau. A rebadged, Canadian-built version of the Ford Ranchero was added in 1957, and continued to be produced until 1959 as the "Meteor Ranchero." The Montcalm series was added in mid-1959 as a counterpart to Ford's new Galaxie models.

Meteor was discontinued as a brand name after 1961 for a number of reasons. The Meteor name was selected for a new vehicle introduced in the Mercury line, the intermediate sized Mercury Meteor, beginning in 1962, and the entire Mercury line had already been dropped down in price (moving closer to the niche previously served by the Meteor brand in Canada) due to slow Mercury sales and the discontinuation of the Edsel brand.

Model names
378,463 were built in model years 1949 through 1961, using the following model names:

 De Luxe / Deluxe (1949-1950)
 Custom (1949)
Custom Deluxe (1950-1951)
Custom Deluxe Victoria (pillarless hardtop coupe; 1951)
 Mainline (1952-1953)
 Customline (1952-1953)
 Customline Victoria (pillarless hardtop coupe; 1952)
Crestline Victoria (pillarless hardtop coupe; 1953)
 Meteor (1954-1961)
 Niagara/Niagara 300 (1954-1959)
 Rideau/Rideau 500 (1954-1961)
Rideau Skyliner (pillarless hardtop with plexiglass roof; 1954)
Rideau Victoria (pillarless hardtop coupe; 1954)
Rideau Crown Victoria (1955)
 Ranchero (1957-1959)
 Montcalm (1958-1961)
 Country Sedan 
 Ranch Wagon 

The Meteor name was not its own brand in model years 1962 and 1963, replaced by the Mercury Meteor, based on the Ford Fairlane. When the brand returned for 1964 they were based on the full-size Mercury rather than Fords as earlier. About 255,000 Meteors were built between 1964 and 1976, in six different series:

 Meteor (1964)
 Custom (1964)
 Rideau/Rideau 500 (1965-1976)
 Montcalm (1965-1976)
 Montego (1967)
 LeMoyne (1968-1970)

1964

Due to dealer pressure, however, Ford released a lower-priced "Mercury 400" in 1963 that stood in the price bracket formerly occupied by the Meteor. When the intermediate Mercury Meteor was dropped after 1963, Ford of Canada relaunched Meteor as a standalone make in 1964, and dropped Mercury's Monterey series in Canada. The 1964 Meteor looked nearly identical to the 1964 Mercury, save for its Ford dashboard and interior, and was available in a base and Custom series.  Sedans, hardtops, and a convertible were offered.  It appears that most, if not all, 1964 Meteor closed models were of the "Breezeway" style, featuring a blocky C-pillar with retractable rear window, while Mercurys offered sleeker "Marauder" models.

1965-1968

For 1965, the full range of model names that had existed in 1961 returned: Rideau, Rideau 500, and Montcalm. The cars used Ford Galaxie bodies but had Mercury-styled front and rear styling.  The Montego was added as a top-range model for 1967, but when that name was selected for use by Mercury in the U.S. beginning in 1968, it was renamed LeMoyne. A sport-themed Montcalm S-33 model was available from 1966-68.  These cars were all basically Ford Galaxies with Mercury styling, they even used Ford's full size wheel covers.

1969-1976

Although Meteor was still considered as a separate marque through 1976, after 1968, the cars also carried Mercury badging and were advertised as the "Mercury Meteor". LeMoyne and Montcalm S-33 models continued through 1970.

1977-1981

After 1976, the Rideau 500 and Montcalm names, as well as the unique trim items, were dropped. The Meteor name was then used on a lower-priced variant of the Mercury Marquis, called the Mercury Marquis Meteor, built until 1981.

References

Further reading
Monarch Meteor, by R. Perry Zavitz

Ford Motor Company of Canada
Cars of Canada
Meteor vehicles
Ford Motor Company Marques
Luxury motor vehicle manufacturers